Peter de Jonge (born April 5, 1954) is an American writer of fiction and non-fiction.

His first novel "Shadows Still Remain" (2009) was a Washington Post Best Book of the Year and the three novels he co-authored with James Patterson were #1 New York Times Best Sellers. He has been a frequent contributor to The New York Times Magazine since 1986, as well as New York magazine, National Geographic, DETAILS, Harper's Bazaar and Manhattan, inc. His non-fiction has been republished in numerous anthologies including Best American Sports Writing in 1996 and 2004. He lives in New York, where his crime novels are set.

Background and education
Peter de Jonge was born in Stamford, Connecticut, and except for three years in Switzerland as a child, grew up there. As a teenager, he was a highly ranked tennis player and competed in the National Juniors in Kalamazoo, Michigan. His father, Alfred de Jonge, was born in Frankfurt, Germany, where he escaped the Holocaust in 1937, then returned eight years later with the U.S. Army to help defeat the German forces. His mother Jane de Jonge is an artist.  After graduating from Princeton University in 1977, de Jonge worked for weekly papers in Ridgefield, Wilton and Redding, Connecticut, and for the Associated Press in Newark and Albany.  In the mid-eighties, while employed as a copywriter at J. Walter Thompson in New York, de Jonge he began writing for Manhattan, inc., The New York Times Magazine and National Geographic.  When those pieces came to the attention of James Patterson, an executive at JWT who was just establishing himself as a best selling author, he hired de Jonge to be the first of his many co-authors on the golf novel Miracle on the 17th Green (1996). After two more partnerships with Patterson on The Beach House (2002)  and Beach Road (2006), de Jonge broke off to create his own critically acclaimed series featuring NYPD Det. Darlene O'Hara, modeled in part on NYPD Homicide Det. Donna Torres.  Shadows Still Remain was published in 2009 and Buried on Avenue B in 2012.

Books
 Buried on Avenue B (2012)
 Shadows Still Remain (2009)

Books co-authored with James Patterson
 Miracle on the 17th Green (1996)
 The Beach House (2002)
 Beach Road (2006)
 Miracle at Augusta (2015)
 Miracle at St. Andrews (2019)

Articles
 "Born on the Baseline," 30 October 1988 https://www.nytimes.com/1988/10/30/magazine/born-on-the-baseline.html?pagewanted=all&src=pm
 "A Soviet Hoopster in the Promised Land," 5 November 1989 https://www.nytimes.com/1989/11/05/magazine/a-soviet-hoopster-in-the-promised-land.html?pagewanted=all&src=pm
 "A 90's Kind of Rivalry," 27 August 1995 http://www.samprasfanz.com/news/1990/19950827.html
 "When the Putting Goes Bad," 13 March 1988 https://www.nytimes.com/1988/03/13/magazine/when-the-putting-goes-bad.html?pagewanted=all&src=pm
 "The Leap of His Life; A Rookie and His Burdens," 22 June 2003 https://www.nytimes.com/2003/06/22/magazine/the-leap-of-his-life-a-rookie-and-his-burdens.html?pagewanted=all&src=pm
 "Television's Final Frontier," 22 August 1999 https://www.nytimes.com/1999/08/22/magazine/television-s-final-frontier.html?pagewanted=all&src=pm
 "Riding the Wild, Perilous Waters of Amazon.com," 14 March 1999 http://partners.nytimes.com/library/tech/99/03/biztech/articles/14amazon.html
 "Being the Big Guy; Actor John Goodman: Funny and Formidable," 10 February 1991 https://www.nytimes.com/1991/02/10/magazine/being-the-big-guy-actor-john-goodman-funny-and-formidable.html?pagewanted=all&src=pm

References
 "An Author's Collaborator Goes It Alone," The New York Times:  https://www.nytimes.com/2009/05/05/books/05dejo.html
 "Writing solo proves rewarding for Peter de Jonge," New York Daily News: http://articles.nydailynews.com/2012-07-22/news/32791570_1_james-patterson-alex-cross-beach-house

1954 births
Living people
Writers from Stamford, Connecticut
Princeton University alumni
21st-century American novelists
American male journalists
American people of German descent
American male novelists
American expatriates in Switzerland
21st-century American male writers
Novelists from Connecticut
21st-century American non-fiction writers